Bertrand St. Ange (born August 6, 1981) is a Seychellois football player. He is a midfielder on the Seychelles national football team.

See also
Football in Seychelles
List of football clubs in Seychelles

References

External links

Seychellois footballers
Association football midfielders
Seychelles international footballers
Living people
1981 births
Place of birth missing (living people)